NYK may stand for:

 New York Knicks, a National Basketball Association team based in New York City.
 Nippon Yusen Kaisha, a shipping company
 NYKU8210506, an NYK-owned shipping container being tracked by the BBC
 Nanyuki Airport, Kenya (IATA code: NYK)
 North Yorkshire, county in England, Chapman code